Pelturagonia spiniceps, the Sarawak eyebrow lizard, is a species of agamid lizard. It is found in Indonesia and Malaysia.

References

Pelturagonia
Reptiles of Indonesia
Reptiles of Malaysia
Reptiles described in 1925
Taxa named by Malcolm Arthur Smith
Taxobox binomials not recognized by IUCN
Reptiles of Borneo